Stewart Detention Center  is a private prison operated by Corrections Corporation of America under contract with the U.S. Immigration and Customs Enforcement, primarily used for housing immigrant detainees.  The facility stands in Lumpkin, Stewart County, Georgia and has an official capacity of 1752 inmates.

In 2011 Stewart was ranked as the largest and busiest such facility in the United States.  Stewart County's share of revenue from the federal government, 85 cents per inmate per day, amounted to more than half of the county's entire annual budget.

Stewart was named one of ten ICE facilities targeted for closure by the Detention Watch Network in 2012, citing the March 2009 death of inmate Roberto Medina-Martinez reportedly caused by medical neglect, among many other serious issues.   Stewart was also identified by the ACLU of Georgia in 2012 as one of four ICE detention centers that demonstrate that "ICE has consistently shown that it is incapable of protecting the basic human rights of immigrants under its care."

References

Prisons in Georgia (U.S. state)
Buildings and structures in Stewart County, Georgia
2004 establishments in Georgia (U.S. state)
Immigration detention centers and prisons in the United States
U.S. Immigration and Customs Enforcement